Amelia Eve is a British actress. She is best known for her role as Jamie in the Netflix original supernatural-horror series The Haunting of Bly Manor.

Early life and career 
Eve was born and raised in London, England. In 2018, Eve appeared in the BBC comedy series Enterprice. In 2020, Eve had a starring role as Jamie opposite Victoria Pedretti in the Netflix series The Haunting of Bly Manor.

Filmography

Film

Television

Music videos

References

External links

21st-century English actresses
English television actresses
Living people
1992 births